Jack Duffy (28 August 1911 – 21 June 1998) was a New Zealand cricketer. He played in nine first-class matches for Wellington from 1940 to 1946.

See also
 List of Wellington representative cricketers

References

External links
 

1911 births
1998 deaths
New Zealand cricketers
Wellington cricketers
Cricketers from Wellington City